Dawson County is a county in the U.S. state of Nebraska. As of the 2010 United States Census, the population was 24,326. Its county seat is Lexington.

Dawson County is part of the Lexington, NE Micropolitan Statistical Area.

In the Nebraska license plate system, Dawson County is represented by the prefix 18 (it had the 18th-largest number of vehicles registered in the county when the license plate system was established in 1922).

History
Dawson County was established by the territorial legislature in 1860; it officially became a county in 1871 by proclamation  of acting Governor William James. The county website states that the county was named for Jacob Dawson, the first postmaster in the settlement of Lancaster County, Nebraska. Other sources offer another possibility: that it was named after Pennsylvania Congressman John Littleton Dawson;

Geography
Dawson County lies near the center of Nebraska, in the portion of the state that observes Central Time.

Major highways

  Interstate 80
  U.S. Highway 30
  U.S. Highway 283
  Nebraska Highway 21
  Nebraska Highway 23
  Nebraska Highway 40
  Nebraska Highway 47

Protected areas

 Bitterns Call State Wildlife Management Area
 Dogwood State Wildlife Management Area
 East Willow Island State Wildlife Management Area
 Gallagher Canyon State Recreation Area

Adjacent counties

 Buffalo County – east
 Phelps County – southeast
 Gosper County – south
 Frontier County – southwest
 Lincoln County – west
 Custer County – north

Demographics

As of the 2020 United States Census, there were 24,111 people and 8,965 households in the county. The population density was 24 people per square mile (9/km2). There were 10,341 housing units. The racial makeup of the county was 72.7% White, 5.5% Black or African American, 2.5% Native American, 1.1% Asian, 0.3% Pacific Islander, 28.7% from other races, and 10.4% from two or more races. 35.8% of the population were Hispanic or Latino of any race. In the 2000 United States Census it was reported that 32.0% were of German, 6.7% American, 6.7% Irish and 6.4% English ancestry.

There were 8,965 households, out of which 27.1% had children under the age of 18 living with them, 58.80% were married couples living together, 7.90% had a female householder with no husband present, and 28.90% were non-families. 24.60% of all households were made up of individuals, and 12.00% had someone living alone who was 65 years of age or older. The average household size was 2.71 and the average family size was 3.21.

The county population contained 29.20% under the age of 18, 8.40% from 18 to 24, 27.60% from 25 to 44, 20.70% from 45 to 64, and 14.10% who were 65 years of age or older. The median age was 34 years. For every 100 females, there were 101.70 males. For every 100 females age 18 and over, there were 100.90 males.

The median income for a household in the county was $36,132, and the median income for a family was $42,224. Males had a median income of $26,865 versus $20,569 for females. The per capita income for the county was $15,973. About 8.60% of families and 10.80% of the population were below the poverty line, including 14.20% of those under age 18 and 9.20% of those age 65 or over.

Communities

Cities
 Cozad
 Gothenburg
 Lexington (county seat)

Villages
 Eddyville
 Farnam
 Overton
 Sumner

Census-designated place
 Willow Island

Unincorporated communities
 Buffalo
 Darr
 Josselyn

Politics

See also
 National Register of Historic Places listings in Dawson County, Nebraska

References

External links
 Dawson County Sheriff's Office

 
Nebraska counties
Lexington Micropolitan Statistical Area
1871 establishments in Nebraska
Populated places established in 1871